South Lyon High School is a public high school located in South Lyon, Michigan, United States, and is part of South Lyon Community Schools. Its cross-town rival is South Lyon East High School.

History
The South Lyon Union School District was formed in 1876. In 1915, South Lyon Union High School was constructed on the same site at Liberty and Warren. It served as the district school for many years and was later used as the School Administration Building until it was demolished in 1998. In 1955, a new high school was built for the district - Bartlett Elementary. Another new High School was established in 1969 (now Millennium Middle School). In 1990, South Lyon High School moved to its current location, at 11 mile and Pontiac Trail. In 1999, South Lyon High School received an addition, that included 22 classrooms, an auxiliary gym, and a new wrestling room. Over the 2007 summer break, South Lyon High School underwent a major renovation including new flooring, new ceilings in the commons area, and more modern design features. Also in 2007, the main construction on South Lyon East High School was completed, and the new, 2nd high school opened in that year. In 2015 SLHS got its football field redone and the name of the field was changed to honor former SLHS student Dominic Ciaramitaro who died lost his life while serving as a Marine in 2011. In 2017 SLHS (abbreviation for South Lyon High School) built a new entrance after a mill bond was passed to upgrade 12 schools in the South Lyon School District. South Lyon's Mascot is the Lion with the colors blue and gold. South Lyon High School also hosts the annual RED OUT, which raises money for the American Heart Association and has brought over 10,000 dollars in some years.

Memberships
North Central Association
Oakland Schools
International Thespian Society

Notable alumni
Anita Cochran, country singer
Danny Spanos, rock music artist
John Heffron (1988), 2004 winner of reality tv series Last Comic Standing
Dave Brandon, former CEO of Domino's Pizza and former athletic director at the University of Michigan.

References

External links

 School website

Public high schools in Michigan
High schools in Oakland County, Michigan
Educational institutions established in 1915
1915 establishments in Michigan